Kollegal Assembly constituency is one of the 224 Legislative Assembly constituencies of Karnataka state in India.

It is part of Chamarajanagar district and is reserved for candidates belonging to the Scheduled Castes.

Members of the Legislative Assembly

Election results

2018

1952

See also
 List of constituencies of the Karnataka Legislative Assembly
 Chamarajanagar district

References

Chamarajanagar district
Assembly constituencies of Karnataka